The 1997 Copa del Rey was the 61st edition of the Spanish basketball Cup. It was organized by the ACB and was played in León in the Palacio de los Deportes between January 31 and February 3, 1997. Joventut Badalona won its seventh title after overcoming 17 points against Cáceres CB, which played its first final.

Bracket

Final

MVP of the Tournament: Andre Turner

References

External links
Boxscores at ACB.com
Linguasport

Copa del Rey de Baloncesto
1996–97 in Spanish basketball